Operation Oasis may refer to:

The 1947 deportation of Zionists captured by the British on the SS Exodus.
An American humanitarian operation in Iraq in 2004. List of coalition military operations of the Iraq War